Rhona Barry (born 24 August 1968) is an Irish sports shooter. She competed in the women's 10 metre air rifle event at the 1996 Summer Olympics.

References

External links
 

1968 births
Living people
Irish female sport shooters
Olympic shooters of Ireland
Shooters at the 1996 Summer Olympics
Sportspeople from County Louth